Troy Randall Brown Jr. (born July 28, 1999) is an American professional basketball player for the Los Angeles Lakers of the National Basketball Association (NBA). In his senior year of high school, Brown was named a 2017 McDonald's All-American. He played college basketball for the Oregon Ducks.

Early life
Brown's mother (track) and father (basketball) competed collegiately at Texas A&M University-Kingsville. His sister, Jada, also played basketball at the University of Kansas.

Recruiting
Brown Jr. was considered one of the best players in the 2017 recruiting class by Scout.com, Rivals.com and ESPN. On November 7, 2016, he committed to playing with the Oregon Ducks. He was one of their top prospects going into his freshman season and continued to uphold this reputation all throughout his college career.

College career
Brown made his collegiate debut on November 10, 2017, recording 18 points in a win against Coppin State University. Three days later, he recorded 17 points, 9 rebounds, and 4 assists in a win over Prairie View A&M University. Brown would get his first double-double of the season by recording 12 points and 10 rebounds in a win against Colorado State University on December 8. Three days later, he would record a season-high 12 rebounds to go with 10 points in a win against Texas Southern University. On December 13, Brown recorded a near triple-double with 10 points, 10 rebounds, and a season-high 9 assists in a win over Portland State University. On New Year's Eve, he would record a season-high 21 points in a win against the University of Colorado. He would later match that season-high with points scored on February 18, 2018 in their win against the University of Washington. Because of his immediate success with Oregon, after the end of his freshman season, Brown declared entry for the 2018 NBA Draft.

In his lone season at Oregon, Brown averaged 11.3 points, 6.2 rebounds and 3.2 assists per game.

Brown appeared in 35 games for the Ducks, averaging 11.3 points, 6.2 rebounds and 3.2 assists in 31.2 minutes per game. Oregon’s leading rebounder, Brown was also second on the team in assists and he shot 44.4 percent from the field, 29.1 percent from three and 74.3 percent from the foul line.

Professional career

Washington Wizards (2018–2021) 

On June 21, 2018, Brown was selected with the 15th overall pick by the Washington Wizards in the 2018 NBA draft. On July 5, he signed his rookie scale contract with the Wizards. On October 24, Brown made his NBA debut, scoring four points in a 122–144 loss to the Golden State Warriors. On March 31, 2019, he logged a season-high 24 points, alongside seven rebounds, in a 95–90 win over the Denver Nuggets.

On December 23, 2019, Brown logged a career-high 26 points, alongside nine rebounds and seven assists, in a 121–115 win over the New York Knicks. On January 4, 2020, he grabbed a career-high 14 rebounds in a 128–114 win over the Denver Nuggets.

Chicago Bulls (2021–2022) 
On March 25, 2021, Brown was traded to the Chicago Bulls in a three-team trade involving the Boston Celtics.

On January 11, 2022, Brown recorded a career-high six steals, alongside seven points, seven rebounds and five assists, in a 133–87 win over the Detroit Pistons. On April 10, he logged a season-high 17 points, alongside 11 rebounds, four assists and two steals, in a 124–120 win over the Minnesota Timberwolves.

Los Angeles Lakers (2022–present) 
On July 1, 2022, Brown signed with the Los Angeles Lakers.

Other work
Brown debuted a Vlog entitled "Life Outside the NBA" on Oct. 7th, 2020 on the Basketballnews.com Network.  He is also a writer for the website covering various on and off the court topics.

National team career
Brown won a gold medal with USA Basketball at the 2016 FIBA Under-17 World Championship.

Career statistics

NBA

Regular season

|-
| style="text-align:left;"| 
| style="text-align:left;"| Washington
| 52 || 10 || 14.0 || .415 || .319 || .681 || 2.8 || 1.5 || .4 || .1 || 4.8
|-
| style="text-align:left;"| 
| style="text-align:left;"| Washington
| 69 || 22 || 25.2 || .439 || .341 || .784 || 5.6 || 2.6 || 1.2 || .1 || 10.4
|-
| style="text-align:left;" rowspan=2| 
| style="text-align:left;"| Washington
| 21 || 0 || 13.7 || .371 || .304 || .667 || 2.9 || .9 || .1 || .2 || 4.3
|-
| style="text-align:left;"| Chicago
| 13 || 0 || 18.2 || .527 || .333 || .833 || 3.4 || .8 || .5 || .2 || 5.5
|-
| style="text-align:left;"| 
| style="text-align:left;"| Chicago
| 66 || 7 || 16.0 || .419 || .353 || .769 || 3.1 || 1.0 || .5 || .1 || 4.3
|- class="sortbottom"
| style="text-align:center;" colspan="2"| Career
| 221 || 39 || 18.5 || .429 || .337 || .755 ||3.8 || 1.6 || .7 || .1 || 6.4

Playoffs

|-
| style="text-align:left;"|2022
| style="text-align:left;"|Chicago
| 3 || 0 || 12.3 || .294 || .182 || — || 2.7 || 1.0 || .7 || .0 || 4.0
|- class="sortbottom"
| style="text-align:center;" colspan="2"|Career
| 3 || 0 || 12.3 || .294 || .182 || — || 2.7 || 1.0 || .7 || .0 || 4.0

College

|-
| style="text-align:left;"| 2017–18
| style="text-align:left;"| Oregon
| 35 || 35 || 31.2 || .444 || .291 || .743 || 6.2 || 3.2 || 1.6 || .2 || 11.3

References

External links

Oregon Ducks bio
USA Basketball profile

1999 births
Living people
African-American basketball players
American men's basketball players
Basketball players from Nevada
Capital City Go-Go players
Chicago Bulls players
McDonald's High School All-Americans
Oregon Ducks men's basketball players
Small forwards
Sportspeople from Las Vegas
Washington Wizards draft picks
Washington Wizards players
21st-century African-American sportspeople